Still Life is the first studio album by American metalcore band American Standards, released on June 30, 2012.

Release 
"Harvester" was the first single from Still Life with an accompanying music video released on June 30, 2012. The second single and video "The Still Life" was released August 19, 2012.

Track listing

Personnel 
Writing, performance and production credits are adapted from the album liner notes.

American Standards 
 Brandon Kellum – vocals
 Brennen Westermeyer – guitar
 Cody Conrad – guitar
 Corey Skowronski – bass
 Geoff Gittleson – drums

Production 
 Joe Gerhard – production, mixing
 Michael Gessert – engineering,
 Jay Maas – mastering at Getaway Recordings, Boston, MA

Design
 Corey Skowronski – art, design

References

External links 
 American Standards on Bandcamp

2013 albums